Happy! is an American live-action/adult animated black comedy/action-drama television series based on the four-issue comic book series of the same name created by writer Grant Morrison and artist Darick Robertson, with Brian Taylor serving as director for a majority of the episodes (seven of the first eleven).

The series premiered on Syfy on December 6, 2017, receiving mostly positive reviews. On January 29, 2018, it was announced that Syfy had renewed the series for a second season, which premiered on March 27, 2019. On June 4, 2019, the series was cancelled by Syfy after two seasons.

Premise
Disgraced police detective Nick Sax (Christopher Meloni) lives as a social outcast, filling his days with heavy drinking and substance abuse, moonlighting as a hitman to feed his various habits. After sustaining a massive heart attack, Nick comes into contact with a small, blue, winged unicorn named Happy (an animated character voiced by Patton Oswalt) that apparently only he can see. Happy explains he is the imaginary friend of a little girl named Hailey, who has been kidnapped by a deranged man dressed as Santa Claus ("Very Bad Santa"). Happy reveals that Hailey is Nick's estranged daughter and sought Nick's aid, believing him to be the hero cop that Hailey envisioned him to be. Though skeptical at first, Nick reluctantly agrees and the two work to save Hailey. The events of their search slowly begin to reveal the existence of a massive, global conspiracy involving child trafficking, sex cults, aliens, ancient gods, and the apocalypse.

Cast and characters

Main
 Christopher Meloni as Nick Sax, a cynical, alcoholic ex-detective turned ex-hitman turned cab driver
 Ritchie Coster as Francisco "Mr. Blue" Scaramucci, a wealthy, insecure, and temperamental crime boss who poses as a legitimate businessman and wine importer
 Coster also portrays Orcus, the Roman god of death who possesses Scaramucci's body
 Lili Mirojnick as Meredith "Merry" McCarthy, a resilient homicide detective with a dark past
 Medina Senghore as Amanda Hansen, Nick's ex-wife and Hailey's mother
 Patrick Fischler as "Smoothie" / "The Bunny", one of Mr. Blue's enforcers and a sociopathic killer who specializes in interrogation and torture
 Patton Oswalt as the voice of Happy, an "imaginary" blue, goofy, cartoonish, winged unicorn
 Christopher Fitzgerald as Louis Sheinberg, a children's entertainer also known as "Sonny Shine", and to Blue as "Mr. Bug" (season 2; recurring season 1)
 Bryce Lorenzo as Hailey Louise Hansen, a young girl who was kidnapped, and sends her imaginary friend Happy to find help (season 2; recurring season 1)

Recurring
 Joseph D. Reitman as Very Bad Santa, a delusional, drug-addicted psychopath dressed like Santa Claus who kidnaps children (recurring season 1; guest season 2)
 Debi Mazar as Isabella Scaramucci, Blue's sister, star of the reality show Secrets of My Sussex, and mother of the four Scaramucci brothers gunned down by Sax
 Gus Halper as Michelangelo "Disco Mikey" Scaramucci, the youngest of Isabella's sons (season 1)
 Laura Poe as Jessica McCarthy, Merry's elderly widowed mother (season 1)
 Michael Maize as Le Dic, an arms dealer connected to Nick Sax's past
 Carly Sullivan as Gala Scaramucci, Blue's wife
 Dante Pereira-Olson as Gerry Scaramucci, Blue's son
 Jaimie Kelton as the voice of Bo Peep, an imaginary friend and Happy's love interest
 Antonia Rey as Assunta, Blue and Isabella Scaramucci's spiritual aunt
 Joseph Perrino as Pal Scaramucci, one of Isabella Scaramucci's sons (season 1)
 Ann-Margret as Bebe Debarge, a former actress and Sonny Shine's wife (season 2)
 Big Show as Big Pink, Blue's prison boyfriend (season 2)
 Laura Darrell as Sister Lee (season 2)
 Curtis Armstrong as Dayglo Doug (season 2)
 Daniel Sunjata as Simon (season 2)

Guest
 Jerry Springer as himself (in "What Smiles are For")
 Alison Fraser as Mrs. Claus (in "When Christmas Was Christmas")
 Billy West as the voice of Raspberry, an imaginary purple three-headed bulldog (in "The Scrapyard of Childish Things")
 "Weird Al" Yankovic as the voice of Smoking Man Baby (in "19 Hours and 13 Minutes")
 Christopher Meloni as Janet Sax, mother of Nick Sax (in "Pervapalooza")
 Amanda Palmer as leader of the Blue Feather (in "Five Chicken Fingers and a Gun")
 Jeff Goldblum as God (in "Resurrection")

Episodes

Season 1 (2017–18)

Season 2 (2019)

Production
Happy was originally voiced by Bobby Moynihan in the pilot, but was later replaced by Patton Oswalt.

Release
The series premiered on Syfy on December 6, 2017. On January 29, 2018, it was announced that Syfy had renewed the series for a second season, which premiered on March 27, 2019. On June 4, 2019, the series was cancelled by Syfy after two seasons.

Reception

Critical response
The review aggregator website Rotten Tomatoes reported an approval rating of 80% with an average rating of 6.2/10 based on 35 reviews. The website's critical consensus states, "Happy! certainly isn't for everyone, but its appealingly oddball concept and strong performances from Chris Meloni and Patton Oswalt make for a gritty, dark comedy with definite—albeit unusual—appeal." Metacritic, which uses a weighted average, assigned a score of 65 out of 100 based on 21 reviews, indicating "generally favorable reviews".

Ratings

Season 1

Season 2

Notes

References

External links

 
 

2010s American black comedy television series
2010s American comedy-drama television series
2010s American crime drama television series
2017 American television series debuts
2019 American television series endings
American crime comedy television series
American fantasy television series
American television series with live action and animation
Christmas television series
English-language television shows
Fictional portrayals of the New York City Police Department
Serial drama television series
Syfy original programming
Television series about organized crime
Television series about television
Television series based on classical mythology
Television series based on Image Comics
Television series by Universal Content Productions
Television shows set in New York City